Jia Juntingxian (born 17 August 1986) is a visually impaired Paralympian athlete from China competing mainly in T11 classification sprint and long jump events. Zhou won two medals at her first Summer Paralympics, the 2012 London Games, in the women's 200m sprint (bronze) and the long jump (silver). Jia is also a World Championships and Asian Games medalists, winning seven medals over five tournaments.

Notes

External links
 

1986 births
Chinese female sprinters
Chinese female long jumpers
Paralympic athletes of China
Athletes (track and field) at the 2012 Summer Paralympics
Athletes (track and field) at the 2016 Summer Paralympics
Paralympic gold medalists for China
Paralympic bronze medalists for China
Paralympic silver medalists for China
Living people
Medalists at the 2012 Summer Paralympics
Medalists at the 2016 Summer Paralympics
Runners from Jiangxi
Paralympic medalists in athletics (track and field)
21st-century Chinese women